is a former Japanese dancer, fashion model, actress, and singer. She performed as a member of the music groups E-girls, Flower, and ShuuKaRen, and was a former exclusive model for JJ and Love Berry.

Fujii announced her retirement from the music industry on December 31, 2017 due to her injuries caused by a cervical herniated disk worsening. Upon her retirement, she announced she would be studying fashion, art, and photography.

Personal life 
Shuuka is the younger sister of Johnny's West member Ryusei Fujii and older sister of E-girls, Happiness and ShuuKaRen member Karen Fujii.

Filmography

TV series

Films

Runways

Advertisements

Bibliography

Style/Photo books

Magazines

Notes

References

External links
Flower profile 
E-girls profile 
JJ profile 
    

Japanese female models
Japanese female dancers
21st-century Japanese actresses
1994 births
Living people
People from Osaka Prefecture
LDH (company) artists